Sjögestad is a locality situated in Linköping Municipality, Östergötland County, Sweden with 300 inhabitants in 2010. The parish church, a mix of the neo-Gothic and neo-Classic belongs to Linköping Diocese. Previously there was a Romanesque church in Sjögestad.

References 

Populated places in Östergötland County
Populated places in Linköping Municipality